Tõnis Sahk (born 1 June 1983) is an Estonian long jumper.

Achievements

References

External links

1983 births
Living people
Estonian male long jumpers